Karl Friedrich von Auwers (September 16, 1863 – May 3, 1939) was a German chemist, and was the academic adviser of both Karl Ziegler and Georg Wittig at the University of Marburg.

Life
He studied at first at the  University of Heidelberg and later with August Wilhelm von Hofmann at the University of Berlin, where he received his Ph.D. in 1885. After one further year with
Hofmann he joined the group of Victor Meyer at the University of Göttingen and later at the University of Heidelberg. He stayed at Heidelberg until he became professor at the University of Greifswald in 1900. He was responsible for the construction of a new chemistry department, of which he chaired. He left in 1913 to become chair of the chemistry department of the University of Marburg where he stayed until his retirement in 1928. Karl von Auwers died on May 3, 1939 in Marburg.

References

1863 births
1939 deaths
20th-century German chemists
Academic staff of the University of Greifswald
Academic staff of the University of Marburg
19th-century German chemists
Members of the Göttingen Academy of Sciences and Humanities